Pultenaea brachyphylla is a species of flowering plant in the family Fabaceae and is endemic to the south of Western Australia. It is an erect, spindly shrub with cylindrical, grooved leaves and yellow, orange and brown flowers.

Description
The flowers are yellow, orange and brown with multicoloured blotches. Flowering occurs from September to October and the fruit is an oval pod.

Taxonomy and naming
Pultenaea brachyphylla was first formally described in 1853 by Nikolai Turczaninow in the Bulletin de la Société Impériale des Naturalistes de Moscou from specimens collected by James Drummond. The specific epithet (brachyphylla) means "short-leaved".

Distribution
This pultenaea occurs in the Esperance Plains and Mallee biogeographic regions, especially in the Fitzgerald River National Park in the south of Western Australia.

Conservation status
Pultenaea brachyphylla is classified as "Priority Two" by the Western Australian Government Department of Parks and Wildlife meaning that it is poorly known and from only one or a few locations.

References

brachyphylla
Eudicots of Western Australia
Taxa named by Nikolai Turczaninow
Plants described in 1853